Irena Joveva is a Slovenian politician and a former news reporter who was elected as a Member of the European Parliament in 2019. In parliament, she has since been serving on the Committee on Culture and Education.

In addition to her committee assignments, Joveva is part of the Parliament's delegation to the EU-North Macedonia Joint Parliamentary Committee. She is also a member of the European Parliament Intergroup on Climate Change, Biodiversity and Sustainable Development, the European Parliament Intergroup on Seas, Rivers, Islands and Coastal Areas and the MEPs Against Cancer group.

She was born to Macedonian parents.

References

1989 births
Living people
MEPs for Slovenia 2019–2024
Women MEPs for Slovenia
Slovenian people of Macedonian descent